The Masonry trowel is a hand trowel used in brickwork or stonework for levelling, spreading and shaping mortar or concrete. They come in several shapes and sizes depending on the task. The following is a list of the more common masonry trowels:

Brick trowel: or mason's trowel is a point-nosed trowel for spreading mortar on bricks or concrete blocks with a technique called "buttering". The shape of the blade allows for very precise control of mortar placement.
Bucket trowel: a wide-bladed tool for scooping mortar from a bucket; it is also good for buttering bricks and smoothing mortar.
Concrete finishing trowel: is used to smooth a surface after the concrete has begun to set; it is held nearly level to the surface of the concrete, and moved with a sweeping arc across the surface. 
Corner trowel: used for shaping concrete around internal or external corners; the handle is located at the center of a 90-degree bend in the blade for balance and the ability to apply even pressure to both sides of a corner.
Gauging trowel: a round-nosed trowel used for mixing mortar and applying small amounts in confined areas; it is also used to replace crumbled mortar and to patch concrete.
Margin trowel: a flat-nosed trowel used to work mortar in tight spaces and corners where a larger pointed trowel will not fit.
Pointing trowel: a smaller version of the brick trowel. Useful for filling in small cavities and repairing crumbling mortar joints.
Pool trowel or round trowel: a variation of the concrete finishing trowel; rounded blade prevents it from digging into wet concrete.
Step trowel: similar to the corner trowel, it is used for shaping inside angles on concrete steps; the center of the 90-degree bend in the blade allows for rounded edges.
Tile setter: a brick trowel with an extra-wide blade to hold more mortar than a standard brick trowel. It is ideal for smoothing mortar on large bricks and blocks.
Tuck pointer: used for neatly packing mortar between bricks and blocks when repointing and repairing crumbling mortar in masonry walls.

References
Reader's Digest Book of Skills and Tools, Reader's Digest. pp. 92–93 

 Mechanical hand tools
 Stonemasonry tools